The Tezi Altarpiece (Italian: Pala Tezi)  is a painting   by the Italian  Renaissance painter   Pietro Perugino, housed in the Galleria Nazionale dell'Umbria of Perugia, Italy.  The work was once associated to a single predella panel portraying the Last Supper, now at the  Gemäldegalerie of Berlin.

The painting was executed for the Tezi Chapel in the church of Sant'Agostino in Perugia. After that monastic institute was suppressed under the Napoleonic domination of Italy, it was acquired by the Umbrian Gallery.

Style
The panel shows the Madonna and Child on a cloud in the sky, flanked by St. Nicholas of Tolentino and Bernardino of Siena. Below, over a wood landscape, are the traditional depictions of  St. Jerome with the lion, and St. Sebastian struck by arrows. At the bottom, in the middle, is a tabernacle opening which once housed the Holy Sacrament. 

The Madonna is taken from the same cartoon used by Perugino for the Madonna of the Consolation, from the same period. Also, the use of colors is not typical of Perugino, and the work was perhaps executed mostly by his workshop, with the master adding just some touches.

References

Sources

Paintings by Pietro Perugino
1500s paintings
Collections of the Galleria Nazionale dell'Umbria
Paintings in the Gemäldegalerie, Berlin
Paintings of the Madonna and Child
Perugino
Perugino
Lions in art
Books in art
Altarpieces